Kanji Swami (1890–1980) was a teacher of Jainism. He was deeply influenced by the Samayasāra of Kundakunda in 1932. He lectured on these teachings for 45 years to comprehensively elaborate on the philosophy described by Kundakunda and others. He was given the title of "Koh-i-Noor of Kathiawar" by the people who were influenced by his religious teachings and philosophy.

Biography

Early years
Kanji Swami was born in Umrala, a small village in the Kathiawar region of Gujarat, in 1890 to a Sthanakvasi family. Although an able pupil in school, he always had an intuition that the worldly teachings was not something that he was looking out for. His mother died when he was thirteen and he lost his father at the age of seventeen. After this, he started looking after his father's shop. He used the frequent periods of lull in the shop in reading various books on religion and spirituality. Turning down the proposals of marriage, he confided in his brother that he wanted to remain celibate and take renunciation.

Renunciation and later life
Kanji Swami became a Sthānakavāsī monastic in 1913 under Hirachanda. During the ceremony, while riding on an elephant, he inauspiciously tore his robe, which was later believed to be an ill omen for his monastic career. Being a believer in self effort for achieving emancipation, he quickly became a learned and famous monk and, backed by his seventeen renditions of the Bhagavati Sutra. He was known as "Koh-i-Noor of Kathiawar" (the gem of the Kathiawad region).

During 1921, he read Kundakunda's Samayasāra, which influenced him greatly. He also studied writings of Pandit Todarmal and Shrimad Rajchandra. Other influences were Amritchandra and Banarasidas. During his discourses, he began to incorporate the ideas picked from these studies and began to lead a kind of double life, nominally a Sthānakavāsī monastic but referring to Digambara texts.

His assertions that "vows, giving and fasting were ultimately worthless if performed without any understanding of the soul" did not endear him to the Sthānakavāsī community. He left Sthānakavāsī monastic life and proclaimed himself a celibate Digambara lay scholar at Songadh in Gujarat in 1934. His lectures were recorded on tapes and have been published. His emphasis was on Nishcaya Naya, the higher level of truth, over Vyavahara Naya, ordinary life. Kanji Swami died on 28 November 1980 at Mumbai.

Philosophy
Kanji Panth is a school of Digambara Jainism that posits that the discriminative knowledge between the "true pure knowledge self" and "the other" is the true and the only procedure of self-realization and the path of liberation where definitions of "true pure knowledge self" and "the other" is as originally practiced and described in Samaysara (Essence of Self), Pravachanasara (Essence of Doctrine) and Pancastikayasara (The five cosmic constituents) and their commentaries. They also quote Amritchandra for their support: "In this world, only those are liberated who have understood the 'art of discriminative knowledge'; In this world, only those are in bondage who do not know the 'art of discriminative knowledge'".

The Digambara Jain scholar Kundakunda, in his Pravacanasara states that a Jain mendicant should meditate on "I, the pure self". Anyone who considers his body or possessions as "I am this, this is mine" is on the wrong road, while one who meditates, thinking the antithesis and "I am not others, they are not mine, I am one knowledge" is on the right road to meditating on the "soul, the pure self". This meditative focus contrasts with the anatta focus of Buddhism, and the atman focus in various vedanta schools of Hinduism such as the advaita and vishistadvaita schools. A special stress is placed on "pure real perspective" (Nishchay Naya), predeterminism, compatibility of predeterminism and free will, and "knowledge of self". The scripture of Samayasara is given the highest status as this book describes path to liberation from "pure real perspective" in contrast to Tattvartha Sutra that describes the same subject matter and has approximately same chapters, but from a different point of view. Gatha 1, Gatha 8, Gatha 11, Gatha 13, Gatha 38, Gatha 73, Gatha 320 and Gatha 412 of Samayasara and Gatha 80, Gatha 114 and Gatha 172 of Pravachanasara are considered particularly important because they include techniques of realizing pure self. Commentaries by Amritchandra on Samaysaara and Pravachansara is also given utmost importance and is considered an integral part of the book. They often site this statement from Albert Einstein in support of their philosophy: "Events do not happen. They already exist and are seen on the Time Machine.". Kanji Panth philosophy is similar to that of the Digambara Terapanth denomination in the lineage of Pandit Todarmal, Banarasidas, Rajmal, Deepchand Kasliwal and Shitalprasad which was largely extinct when Kanji Swami arrived on the scene.

There is no centralized management of temples. All Temples are managed independently by a local board of trustees. Apart from numerous temples in India, temples exist in Brampton, Canada; Harrow, London, ; and Mombasa, Kenya.

In an interview in 1977, he denied being hostile to the traditional Jain monasticism and regarded monastics as personifying the fundamental principles of Jainism. However, he also pointed out that taking up formal initiation and behavioural practices, like the abandonment of clothes of Digambara monks, and of other possessions, could not make an individual a true monastic unless he had abandoned internal possessions as well.

Legacy

The Digambara Jaina Svādhyāya Mandira was built in 1937. It houses the text Samayasāra in the main temple and the words of Kundakunda's five main treatises have been engraved on its walls. A temple dedicated to Jain Tirthankara Simandhara was consecrated in 1941. Kanji Swami travelled throughout India where he gave discourses and consecrated many temples. Songadh is a major centre. Kanji Swami has many followers in the Jain diaspora. They generally regard themselves simply as Digambara Jains, more popularly known as Mumukshu, following the mystical tradition of Kundakunda and Pandit Todarmal.

See also
 Taran Panth

References

Citations

Sources
 

1889 births
1980 deaths
Place of birth missing
Indian Jain religious leaders
Gujarati people
Jain reformers
Scholars of Jainism